She Goes Down may refer to:
"She Goes Down", a song by Billy Squier from the album Creatures of Habit
"She Goes Down", a song by Gotthard from the album Dial Hard
"She Goes Down", a song by Mötley Crüe from the album Dr. Feelgood